Tyefo, also spelled Cɛfɔ, Tiéfo, Kiefo, Tyeforo, is a language of Burkina Faso. It may be a peripheral member of the Gur languages, but it is of uncertain affiliation.

Classification
Güldemann (2018) considers Tiefo to be of uncertain affiliation within Niger-Congo.

Varieties
The two extant languages are provisionally called Tiefo-N (Tiefo of Numudara / Niafogo) and Tiefo-D (Tiefo of Daramandugu). They are mutually unintelligible. Tiefo-D is spoken in parts of the village cluster Daramandougou (Dramandougou, Daramandugu) of Comoé Province. Its phonology, morphology, some basic grammar, and lexicon were described in Kerstin Winkelmann's 1998 doctoral dissertation (in German). A short Tiefo-N grammar by Heath, Ouattara, and Hantgan, based on salvage fieldwork with the last two known competent speakers from Nyafogo, was published in 2017. Winkelmann's dissertation includes limited data from both Tiefo-N varieties. Heath and Ouattara began a field project focusing on Tiefo-D in 2017.

Tiefo varieties were formerly spoken over a much wider area. They have been steadily declining ever since Tiefo military power was broken in an 1897 battle. Jula (Dioula) is now the dominant spoken language throughout southwestern Burkina Faso.

Villages
Tiefo villages:

Grammar
One notable feature of Tiefo languages is a vocalic morpheme that precedes nouns under some conditions. In Tiefo-D it is ē, and it appears chiefly in postpausal position. Tiefo-N has à, è, and ò, constituting a noun-class system with a partial semantic basis. These prenominal markers are apparently unrelated to the original Gur system of noun-class suffixes. Traces of old noun-class suffixes, now frozen to stems and no longer synchronically segmentable, have been discussed by Winkelmann and other Gur specialists.

Verb phrases in Tiefo languages consist of two (Tiefo-N) or three (Tiefo-D) forms of the verb stem, plus preverbal inflectional particles marking aspect and negation. Verbs show no further morphological variation. The two Tiefo-N verb forms are called perfective and imperfective, but their distribution among clause-level inflectional categories is more complex than this suggests. Tiefo-D verbs have at most three distinct forms called perfective, imperfective, and base, but some verbs merge imperfective and base. In both languages, the forms of a given verb are morphophonologically related to each other by some combination of vocalic mutation, tonal shift, and/or suffixation.

See also
Tiefo word list (Wiktionary)

References

 Kerstin Winkelmann. 1998. Die Sprache der Cɛfɔ von Daramandugu (Burkina Faso). Ph.D. dissertation, Frankfurt am Main.
 Berthelette, Carol; Berthelette, John. 2002. Sociolinguistic survey report for the Tiéfo language. SIL Electronic Survey Reports 2002-006. PDF.
 Jeffrey Heath, Aminata Ouattara & Abbie Hantgan. 2017. Short grammar of Tiefo-N of Nyafogo (Gur, Burkina Faso). Language Description Heritage Dictionary (online). http://hdl.handle.net/11858/00-001M-0000-002C-2F37-1

External links 
 ELAR archive of the Tiefo language: grammar sketch, lexicon, collection of texts
 materials on Tiefo from ongoing project led by Heath

Gur languages